The 1957 Lafayette Leopards football team was an American football team that represented Lafayette College during the 1957 NCAA University Division football season. Lafayette finished last in the Middle Three Conference.

In their sixth and final year under head coach Steve Hokuf, the Leopards compiled a 4–4 record, but lost both games to their conference opponents. William Harrick and Joseph Bozik were the team captains.

Like many college campuses, Lafayette was hit hard by an outbreak of Asian flu in October. The Leopards won their Oct. 5 game against Buffalo despite having nine players, including seven starters, confined to bed. The list of influenza patients grew to greater than 20 over the following week, prompting the college to cancel a scheduled Oct. 12 matchup with Delaware.

Lafayette played its home games at Fisher Field on College Hill in Easton, Pennsylvania.

Schedule

References

Lafayette
Lafayette Leopards football seasons
Lafayette Leopards football